is a district located in Tokachi Subprefecture, Hokkaido, Japan.

As of 2004, the district has an estimated population of 59,819 and a density of 32.76 persons per km2. The total area is 1,825.78 km2.

Towns
Kamishihoro
Otofuke
Shihoro
Shikaoi

History
1869 Provinces and districts established in Hokkaido.  Katō district established in Tokachi Province.
April 1, 1906 Biman Village and Nishishihoro Village from this district and Memuro Village, Bisei Village and Haobi Village from Kasai District merge to form Memuro Village (now Town) in Kasai District
April 1, 1925 Part of Ikeda Village (now Town) in Nakagawa District incorporated into Shihoro Village
June, 1933 Another part of Ikeda Town in Nakagawa District incorporated into Shihoro Village.

Districts in Hokkaido